The 2020–21 B.League season was the fifth season of the Japanese B.League.

B1

Regular season 

East District

West District

B1 Individual statistic leaders

B2

Regular season 

East District

West District

B2 Individual statistic leaders

References 

2020–21 in Asian basketball leagues
B.League
B.League seasons